Hans Muchitsch (30 September 1932 – 10 May 2019) was an Austrian athlete. He competed in the men's decathlon at the 1960 Summer Olympics.

References

External links
 

1932 births
2019 deaths
Athletes (track and field) at the 1960 Summer Olympics
Austrian decathletes
Olympic athletes of Austria
People from Wolfsberg District
Sportspeople from Carinthia (state)